Henk van Essen (5 February 1909 – 23 December 1968) was a Dutch freestyle swimmer. He competed in two events at the 1928 Summer Olympics.

References

External links
 

1909 births
1968 deaths
Dutch male freestyle swimmers
Olympic swimmers of the Netherlands
Swimmers at the 1928 Summer Olympics
Swimmers from Amsterdam